This article shows the rosters of all participating teams at the 2016 Memorial of Hubert Jerzy Wagner in Kraków, Poland.



The following is the Bulgarian roster in the 2016 Memorial of Hubert Jerzy Wagner.

Head coach:  Plamen Konstantinov

The following is the Polish roster in the 2016 Memorial of Hubert Jerzy Wagner.

Head coach:  Stéphane Antiga



References

External links
Official website

Memorial of Hubert Jerzy Wagner squads